Agrupación Deportiva Almería was a Spanish football club based in Almería, in the autonomous community of Andalusia. Founded in 1971, it held home matches at Estadio Municipal Juan Rojas, with a 13,468-seat capacity.

History
In only two years, AD Almería were promoted from the newly created Segunda División B to La Liga, finishing ninth in their debut season in the latter. The club had been founded just eight years earlier.

In 1982, however, due to severe economic problems, the team was forced to fold, being replaced in the city by CP Almería and, in 1989, by UD Almería, which would also appear in the top flight, in the 2000s.

Season to season

2 seasons in La Liga
2 seasons in Segunda División
1 season in Segunda División B
5 seasons in Tercera División

References

Defunct football clubs in Andalusia
Sport in Almería
Ad Almeria
Association football clubs established in 1971
Association football clubs disestablished in 1982
1971 establishments in Spain
1982 disestablishments in Spain
Segunda División clubs
La Liga clubs